Óscar González, Oscar González or Oscar Gonzáles may refer to:

 Óscar González (Chilean footballer) (1894–1959), Chilean football midfielder
 Óscar González (racing driver) (1923–2006), Uruguayan racing driver
 Oscar González Guerrero (1926–2017), Mexican comic book artist
 Óscar González-Quevedo (1930–2019), Spanish Jesuit priest
 Óscar González (politician) (born 1951), Member of the Mexican Chamber of Deputies
 Oscar González Loyo (born 1959), Mexican comic book artist
 Óscar González (decathlete) (born 1976), decathlete from Spain
 Óscar González (Spanish footballer) (born 1982), Spanish footballer for Real Valladolid
 Óscar González (boxer) (1990–2014), Mexican boxer
 Óscar González (Venezuelan footballer) (born 1992), Venezuelan footballer
 Oscar González (baseball) (born 1998), Dominican baseball player
 Oscar Gonzáles (writer), author and poet from Honduras
 Oscar Gonzales (table tennis), Argentine table tennis player